Arboricornus is a genus of moths of the family Noctuidae. The genus was erected by George Hampson in 1894.

Species
Arboricornus chrysopepla (Hampson, 1908) Uganda
Arboricornus examplata Warren, 1913 India (Meghalaya)
Arboricornus ruber Hampson, 1894 India (Assam)

References

Acronictinae